Traité de mécanique céleste is a five-volume treatise on celestial mechanics written by Pierre-Simon Laplace and published from 1798 to 1825 with a second edition in 1829. In 1842, the government of Louis Philippe gave a grant of 40,000 francs for a 7-volume national edition of the Oeuvres de Laplace (1843–1847); the Traité de mécanique céleste with its four supplements occupies the first 5 volumes.

Tome I. (1798)

Livre I. Des lois générales de l'équilibre et du mouvement
 Chap. I. De l'équilibre et de la composition des forces qui agissent sur un point matériel
 Chap. II. Du mouvement d'un point matériel
 Chap. III. De l'équilibre d'un système de corps
 Chap. IV. De l'équilibre des fluides
 Chap. V. Principes généraux du mouvement d'un système de corps
 Chap. VI. Des lois du mouvement d'un système de corps, dans toutes les relations mathématiquement possibles entre la force et la vitesse
 Chat. VII. Des mouvemens d'un corps solide de figure quelconque
 Chap. VIII. Du mouvement des fluides

Livre II. De la loi pesanteur universelle, et du mouvement des centres de gravité des corps célestes

Tome II. (1798)

Livre III. De la figure des corps céleste

Livre IV. Des oscillations de la mer et de l'atmosphère

Livre V. Des mouvemens des corps célestes, autour de leurs propre centres de gravité

Tome III. (1802)

Livre VI. Théorie particulières des mouvemens célestes

Livre VII. Théorie de la lune

Tome IV. (1805)

Livre VIII. Théorie des satellites de Jupiter, de Saturne et d'Uranus

Livre IX. Théorie des comètes

Livre X. Sur différens points relatifs au système du monde

Tome V. (1825)

Livre XI. De la figure et de la rotation de la terre

Livre XII. De l'attraction et de la répulsion des sphères, et des lois de l'equilibre et du mouvement des fluides élastiques

Livre XIII. Des oscillations des fluides qui recouvrent les planètes

Livre XIV. Des mouvemens des corps célestes autour de leurs centres de gravité

Livre XV. Du mouvement des planètes et des comètes

Livre XVI. Du mouvement des satellites

English translations
During the early nineteenth century at least five English translations of Mécanique Céleste were published. In 1814 the Reverend John Toplis prepared a translation of Book 1 entitled The Mechanics of Laplace. Translated with Notes and Additions. In 1821 Thomas Young anonymously published a further translation into English of the first book; beyond just translating from French to English he claimed in the preface to have translated the style of mathematics: The translator flatters himself, however, that he has not expressed the author’s meaning in English words alone, but that he has rendered it perfectly intelligible to any person, who is conversant with the English mathematicians of the old school only, and that his book will serve as a connecting link between the geometrical and algebraical modes of representation.The Reverend Henry Harte, a fellow at Trinity College, Dublin translated the entire first volume of Mécanique Céleste, with Book 1 published in 1822 and Book 2 published separately in 1827. Similarly to Bowditch (see below), Harte felt that Laplace's exposition was too brief, making his work difficult to understand:... it may be safely asserted, that the chief obstacle to a more general knowledge of the work, arises from the summary manner in which the Author passes over the intermediate steps in several of his most interesting investigations.

Bowditch's translation 
The famous American mathematician Nathaniel Bowditch translated the first four volumes of the Traité de mécanique céleste but not the fifth volume; however, Bowditch did make use of relevant portions of the fifth volume in his extensive commentaries for the first four volumes.

Somerville's translation 
In 1826, it was still felt by Henry Brougham, president of the Society for the Diffusion of Useful Knowledge, that the British reader was lacking a readable translation of Mécanique Céleste. He thus approached Mary Somerville, who began to prepare a translation which would "explain to the unlearned the sort of thing it is - the plan, the vast merit, the wonderful truths unfolded or methodized - and the calculus by which all this is accomplished". In 1830, John Herschel wrote to Somerville and enclosed a copy of Bowditch's 1828 translation of Volume 1 which Herschel had just received. Undeterred, Somerville decided to continue with the preparation of her own work as she felt the two translations differed in their aims; whereas Bowditch's contained an overwhelming number of footnotes to explain each mathematical step, Somerville instead wished to state and demonstrate the results as clearly as possible.

A year later, in 1831, Somerville's translation was published under the title Mechanism of the Heavens. It received great critical acclaim, with complimentary reviews appearing in the Quarterly Review, the Edinburgh Review, and the Monthly Notices of the Royal Astronomical Society.

References

External links
Translation by Nathaniel Bowditch
 Volume I, 1829
 Volume II, 1832
 Volume III, 1834
 Volume IV, 1839 with a memoir of the translator by his son

Historical physics publications
Physics books
Mathematics books
1798 non-fiction books
French books
Celestial mechanics